Phalacrocoracidae is a family of approximately 40 species of aquatic birds commonly known as cormorants and shags. Several different classifications of the family have been proposed, but in 2021 the IOU (formerly the IOC) adopted a consensus taxonomy of seven genera. The great cormorant (Phalacrocorax carbo) and the common shag (Gulosus aristotelis) are the only two species of the family commonly encountered in Britain and Ireland and "cormorant" and "shag" appellations have been later assigned to different species in the family somewhat haphazardly.

The majority of species have dark feathers. The bill is long, thin and hooked. Their feet have webbing between all four toes. All species are fish-eaters, catching the prey by diving from the surface. They have relatively short wings due to their need for economical movement underwater, and consequently have among the highest flight costs of any flying bird.

Cormorants nest in colonies around the shore, on trees, islets or cliffs. They are coastal rather than oceanic birds, and some have colonised inland waters. The original ancestor of cormorants seems to have been a fresh-water bird. They range around the world, except for the central Pacific islands.

Names 
"Cormorant" is a contraction derived either directly from Latin corvus marinus, "sea raven", or through Brythonic Celtic. Cormoran is the Cornish name of the sea giant in the tale of Jack the Giant Killer. Indeed, "sea raven" or analogous terms were the usual terms for cormorants in Germanic languages until after the Middle Ages. The French explorer André Thévet commented in 1558: "the beak [is] similar to that of a cormorant or other corvid", which demonstrates that the erroneous belief that the birds were related to ravens lasted at least to the 16th century.

No consistent distinction exists between cormorants and shags. The names "cormorant" and "shag" were originally the common names of the two species of the family found in Great Britain Phalacrocorax carbo (now referred to by ornithologists as the great cormorant) and Gulosus aristotelis (the European shag). "Shag" refers to the bird's crest, which the British forms of the great cormorant lack. As other species were encountered by English-speaking sailors and explorers elsewhere in the world, some were called cormorants and some shags, depending on whether they had crests or not. Sometimes the same species is called a cormorant in one part of the world and a shag in another, e.g., the great cormorant is called the black shag in New Zealand (the birds found in Australasia have a crest that is absent in European members of the species). Van Tets (1976) proposed to divide the family into two genera and attach the name "cormorant" to one and "shag" to the other, but this nomenclature has not been widely adopted.

Description 

Cormorants and shags are medium-to-large seabirds. The majority, including nearly all Northern Hemisphere species, have mainly dark plumage, but some Southern Hemisphere species are black and white, and a few (e.g. the spotted shag of New Zealand) are quite colourful. Many species have areas of coloured skin on the face (the lores and the gular skin) which can be bright blue, orange, red or yellow, typically becoming more brightly coloured in the breeding season. The bill is long, thin, and sharply hooked. Their feet have webbing between all four toes, as in their relatives.

Habitat 

They are coastal rather than oceanic birds, and some have colonised inland waters – indeed, the original ancestor of cormorants seems to have been a fresh-water bird, judging from the habitat of the most ancient lineage. They range around the world, except for the central Pacific islands.

Behaviour 
All cormorants and shags are fish-eaters, dining on small eels, fish, and even water snakes. They dive from the surface, though many species make a characteristic half-jump as they dive, presumably to give themselves a more streamlined entry into the water. Under water they propel themselves with their feet, though some also propel themselves with their wings (see the picture, commentary, and existing reference video).

After fishing, cormorants go ashore, and are frequently seen holding their wings out in the sun. All cormorants have preen gland secretions that are used ostensibly to keep the feathers waterproof. Some sources state that cormorants have waterproof feathers while others say that they have water-permeable feathers. Still others suggest that the outer plumage absorbs water but does not permit it to penetrate the layer of air next to the skin. The wing drying action is seen even in the flightless cormorant but not in the Antarctic shags or red-legged cormorants. Alternate functions suggested for the spread-wing posture include that it aids thermoregulation or digestion, balances the bird, or indicates presence of fish. A detailed study of the great cormorant concludes that it is without doubt to dry the plumage.

Cormorants are colonial nesters, using trees, rocky islets, or cliffs. The eggs are a chalky-blue colour. There is usually one brood a year. Parents regurgitate food to feed their young, whose deep, ungainly bills show a greater resemblance to those of the pelicans (to which they are related) than is obvious in the adults.

Taxonomy 
The scientific family name is Latinised from Ancient Greek  phalakros "bald" and  korax "raven". This is often thought to refer to the creamy white patch on the cheeks of adult great cormorants, or the ornamental white head plumes prominent in Mediterranean birds of this species, but is certainly not a unifying characteristic of cormorants.

The cormorant family are a group traditionally placed within the Pelecaniformes or, in the Sibley–Ahlquist taxonomy, the expanded Ciconiiformes. This latter group is certainly not a natural one, and even after the tropicbirds have been recognised as quite distinct, the remaining Pelecaniformes seem not to be entirely monophyletic. Their relationships and delimitation – apart from being part of a "higher waterfowl" clade which is similar but not identical to Sibley and Ahlquist's "pan-Ciconiiformes" – remain mostly unresolved. Notwithstanding, all evidence agrees that the cormorants and shags are closer to the darters and Sulidae (gannets and boobies), and perhaps the pelicans or even penguins, than to all other living birds.

In recent years, three preferred treatments of the cormorant family have emerged: either to leave all living cormorants in a single genus, Phalacrocorax, or to split off a few species such as the imperial shag complex (in Leucocarbo) and perhaps the flightless cormorant. Alternatively, the genus may be disassembled altogether and in the most extreme case be reduced to the great, white-breasted and Japanese cormorants. In 2014, a landmark study proposed a 7 genera treatment, which was adopted by the IUCN Red List and BirdLife International, and later by the IOC in 2021, standardizing it.

The cormorants and the darters have a unique bone on the back of the top of the skull known as the os nuchale or occipital style which was called a xiphoid process in early literature. This bony projection provides anchorage for the muscles that increase the force with which the lower mandible is closed. This bone and the highly developed muscles over it, the M. adductor mandibulae caput nuchale, are unique to the families Phalacrocoracidae and Anhingidae.

Several evolutionary groups are still recognizable. However, combining the available evidence suggests that there has also been a great deal of convergent evolution; for example the cliff shags are a convergent paraphyletic group. The proposed division into Phalacrocorax sensu stricto (or subfamily "Phalacrocoracinae") cormorants and Leucocarbo sensu lato (or "Leucocarboninae") shags does have some degree of merit. The resolution provided by the mtDNA 12S rRNA and ATPase subunits six and eight sequence data is not sufficient to properly resolve several groups to satisfaction; in addition, many species remain unsampled, the fossil record has not been integrated in the data, and the effects of hybridisation – known in some Pacific species especially – on the DNA sequence data are unstudied.

A multigene molecular phylogenetic study published in 2014 provided a genus-level phylogeny of the family.

List of genera

As per the IOU, the IUCN Red List and BirdLife International, the family contains 7 genera:

Prior to 2021, the IOU (or formerly the IOC) classified all these species in just Microcarbo, Phalacrocorax, and Leucocarbo.

Some authorities such as the Clements Checklist have just two genera, Microcarbo with 5 species, and the rest in Phalacrocorax.

For details, see the article "List of cormorant species".

Evolution and fossil record
Cormorants have a very ancient body plan, with similar birds reaching back to the time of the dinosaurs. In fact, the earliest known modern bird, Gansus yumenensis, had essentially the same structure. The details of the evolution of the cormorant are mostly unknown. Even the technique of using the distribution and relationships of a species to figure out where it came from, biogeography, usually very informative, does not give very specific data for this probably rather ancient and widespread group. However, the closest living relatives of the cormorants and shags are the other families of the suborder Sulae—darters and gannets and boobies—which have a primarily Gondwanan distribution. Hence, at least the modern diversity of Sulae probably originated in the southern hemisphere.

While the Leucocarbonines are almost certainly of southern Pacific origin—possibly even the Antarctic which, at the time when cormorants evolved, was not yet ice-covered—all that can be said about the Phalacrocoracines is that they are most diverse in the regions bordering the Indian Ocean, but generally occur over a large area.

Similarly, the origin of the family is shrouded in uncertainties. Some Late Cretaceous fossils have been proposed to belong with the Phalacrocoracidae:
A scapula from the Campanian-Maastrichtian boundary, about 70 mya (million years ago), was found in the Nemegt Formation in Mongolia; it is now in the PIN collection. It is from a bird roughly the size of a spectacled cormorant, and quite similar to the corresponding bone in Phalacrocorax. A Maastrichtian (Late Cretaceous, c. 66 mya) right femur, AMNH FR 25272 from the Lance Formation near Lance Creek, Wyoming, is sometimes suggested to be the second-oldest record of the Phalacrocoracidae; this was from a rather smaller bird, about the size of a long-tailed cormorant. However, cormorants likely originated much later, and these are likely misidentifications.

As the Early Oligocene "Sula" ronzoni cannot be assigned to any of the suloid families—cormorants and shags, darters, and gannets and boobies—with certainty, the best interpretation is that the Phalacrocoracidae diverged from their closest ancestors in the Early Oligocene, perhaps some 30 million years ago, and that the Cretaceous fossils represent ancestral suloids, "pelecaniforms" or "higher waterbirds"; at least the last lineage is generally believed to have been already distinct and undergoing evolutionary radiation at the end of the Cretaceous. What can be said with near certainty is that AMNH FR 25272 is from a diving bird that used its feet for underwater locomotion; as this is liable to result in some degree of convergent evolution and the bone is missing indisputable neornithine features, it is not entirely certain that the bone is correctly referred to this group.

Phylogenetic evidence indicates that the cormorants diverged from their closest relatives, the darters, during the Late Oligocene, indicating that most of the claims of Cretaceous or early Paleogene cormorant occurrences are likely misidentifications.

During the late Paleogene, when the family presumably originated, much of Eurasia was covered by shallow seas, as the Indian Plate finally attached to the mainland. Lacking a detailed study, it may well be that the first "modern" cormorants were small species from eastern, south-eastern or southern Asia, possibly living in freshwater habitat, that dispersed due to tectonic events. Such a scenario would account for the present-day distribution of cormorants and shags and is not contradicted by the fossil record; as remarked above, a thorough review of the problem is not yet available.

Even when Phalacrocorax was used to unite all living species, two distinct genera of prehistoric cormorants became widely accepted today:
 Limicorallus (Indricotherium middle Oligocene of Chelkar-Teniz, Kazakhstan)
 Nectornis (Late Oligocene/Early Miocene of Central Europe – Middle Miocene of Bes-Konak, Turkey) – includes Oligocorax miocaenus

The proposed genus Oligocorax appears to be paraphyletic – the European species have been separated in Nectornis, and the North American ones placed in the expanded Phalacrocorax; the latter might just as well be included in Nannopterum. A Late Oligocene fossil cormorant foot from Enspel, Germany, sometimes placed in Oligocorax, would then be referable to Nectornis if it proves not to be too distinct. Limicorallus, meanwhile, was initially believed to be a rail or a dabbling duck by some. There are also undescribed remains of apparent cormorants from the Quercy Phosphorites of Quercy (France), dating to some time between the Late Eocene and the mid-Oligocene. All these early European species might belong to the basal group of "microcormorants", as they conform with them in size and seem to have inhabited the same habitat: subtropical coastal or inland waters. While this need not be more than convergence, the phylogeny of the modern (sub)genus Microcarbo – namely, whether the Western Eurasian M. pygmaeus is a basal or highly derived member of its clade – is still not well understood at all as of 2022.

Some other Paleogene remains are sometimes assigned to the Phalacrocoracidae, but these birds seem rather intermediate between cormorants and darters (and lack clear autapomorphies of either). Thus, they may be quite basal members of the Palacrocoracoidea. The taxa in question are:
 Piscator (Late Eocene of England)
 "Pelecaniformes" gen. et sp. indet. (Jebel Qatrani Early Oligocene of Fayum, Egypt)  – similar to Piscator?
 Borvocarbo (Late Oligocene of C Europe)

The supposed Late Pliocene/Early Pleistocene "Valenticarbo" is a nomen dubium and given its recent age probably not a separate genus.

The remaining fossil species are not usually placed in a modern phylogenetic framework. While the numerous western US species are most likely prehistoric representatives of the coastal Urile or inland Nannopterum, the European fossils pose much more of a problem due to the singular common shag being intermediate in size between the other two European cormorant lineages, and as of 2022 still of mysterious ancestry; notably, a presumably lost collection of Late Miocene fossils from the Odesa region may have contained remains of all three (sub)genera inhabiting Europe today. Similarly, the Plio-Pleistocene fossils from Florida have been allied with Nannopterum and even Urile, but may conceivably be Phalacrocorax; they are in serious need of revision since it is not even clear how many species are involved. Provisionally, the fossil species are thus all placed in Phalacrocorax here:
 Phalacrocorax marinavis (Oligocene – Early Miocene of Oregon, US) – formerly Oligocorax; Urile or Nannopterum?
 Phalacrocorax littoralis (Late Oligocene/Early Miocene of St-Gérand-le-Puy, France) – formerly Oligocorax; Nectornis?
 Phalacrocorax intermedius (Early – Middle Miocene of C Europe) – includes P. praecarbo, Ardea/P. brunhuberi and Botaurites avitus; Microcarbo, Phalacrocorax or Gulosus?
 Phalacrocorax macropus (Early Miocene – Pliocene of north-west US) – Urile or Nannopterum?
 Phalacrocorax ibericus (Late Miocene of Valles de Fuentiduena, Spain) – Microcarbo, Phalacrocorax or Gulosus?
 Phalacrocorax lautus (Late Miocene of Golboçica, Moldavia) – Microcarbo, Phalacrocorax or Gulosus?
 Phalacrocorax serdicensis (Late Miocene of Hrabarsko, Bulgaria); Microcarbo, Phalacrocorax or Gulosus?
 Phalacrocorax sp(p). (Late Miocene of Odesa region, Ukraine) – up to 4 species, one of which is probably P. longipes; Microcarbo, Phalacrocorax and/or Gulosus?
 Phalacrocorax femoralis (Modelo Late Miocene/Early Pliocene of WC North America) – formerly Miocorax;  Nannopterum?
 Phalacrocorax sp. (Late Miocene/Early Pliocene of Lee Creek Mine, US) – Nannopterum or Phalacrocorax?
 Phalacrocorax sp. 1 (Late Miocene/Early Pliocene of WC South America) – probably Leucocarbo
 Phalacrocorax sp. 2 (Pisco Late Miocene/Early Pliocene of SW Peru) – Poikilocarbo or Leucocarbo?
 Phalacrocorax longipes (Late Miocene – Early Pliocene of Ukraine) – formerly Pliocarbo; Microcarbo, Phalacrocorax or Gulosus?
 Phalacrocorax goletensis (Early Pliocene – Early Pleistocene of Mexico) – Urile or  Nannopterum, perhaps Poikilocarbo or Leuocarbo
 Phalacrocorax wetmorei (Bone Valley Early Pliocene of Florida) – Nannopterum or Phalacrocorax?
 Phalacrocorax sp. (Bone Valley Early Pliocene of Polk County, Florida, US) – Nannopterum or Phalacrocorax?
 Phalacrocorax leptopus (Juntura Early/Middle Pliocene of Juntura, Malheur County, Oregon, US) – Nannopterum?
 Phalacrocorax reliquus (Middle Pliocene of Mongolia) – Microcarbo, Phalacrocorax or Gulosus?
 Phalacrocorax idahensis (Middle Pliocene – Pleistocene of Idaho, US, and possibly Florida) – Nannopterum?
 Phalacrocorax destefanii (Late Pliocene of Italy) – formerly Paracorax; Microcarbo, Phalacrocorax or Gulosus?
 Phalacrocorax filyawi  (Pinecrest Late Pliocene of Florida, US) – may be P. idahensis; Nannopterum or Phalacrocorax, perhaps Urile?
 Phalacrocorax kennelli (San Diego Late Pliocene of California, US) – Urile or Nannopterum?
 Phalacrocorax kumeyaay (San Diego Late Pliocene of California, US) – Urile or Nannopterum?
 Phalacrocorax macer (Late Pliocene of Idaho, US) – Nannopterum?
 Phalacrocorax mongoliensis (Late Pliocene of W Mongolia) – Microcarbo, Phalacrocorax or Gulosus?
 Phalacrocorax sp. (La Portada Late Pliocene of N Chile) – may be same as Late Miocene/Early Pliocene "Phalacrocorax sp. 2"; Poikilocarbo or Leucocarbo?
 Phalacrocorax rogersi (Late Pliocene – Early Pleistocene of California, US) – Urile or Nannopterum?
 Phalacrocorax chapalensis (Late Pliocene/Early Pleistocene of Jalisco, Mexico) – Urile or  Nannopterum, perhaps Poikilocarbo or Leucocarbo?
 Phalacrocorax gregorii (Late Pleistocene of Australia) – possibly not a valid species; Microcarbo, Phalacrocorax or Leucocarbo?
 Phalacrocorax vetustus (Late Pleistocene of Australia) – formerly Australocorax, possibly not a valid species; Microcarbo, Phalacrocorax or Leucocarbo?
 Phalacrocorax sp. (Sarasota County, Florida, US) – may be P. filawyi/idahensis; Nannopterum or Phalacrocorax?

The former "Phalacrocorax" (or "Oligocorax") mediterraneus is now considered to belong to the bathornithid Paracrax antiqua. "P." subvolans was actually a darter (Anhinga).

In human culture

Cormorant fishing

Humans have used cormorants' fishing skills in various places in the world. Archaeological evidence suggests that cormorant fishing was practised in Ancient Egypt, Peru, Korea and India, but the strongest tradition has remained in China and Japan, where it reached commercial-scale level in some areas. In Japan, cormorant fishing is called . Traditional forms of ukai can be seen on the Nagara River in the city of Gifu, Gifu Prefecture, where cormorant fishing has continued uninterrupted for 1300 years, or in the city of Inuyama, Aichi. In Guilin, Guangxi, cormorants are famous for fishing on the shallow Li River. In Gifu, the Japanese cormorant (P. capillatus) is used; Chinese fishermen often employ great cormorants (P. carbo). In Europe, a similar practice was also used on Doiran Lake in the region of Macedonia. James VI and I appointed a keeper of cormorants, John Wood, and built ponds at Westminster to train the birds to fish.

In a common technique, a snare is tied near the base of the bird's throat, which allows the bird only to swallow small fish. When the bird captures and tries to swallow a large fish, the fish is caught in the bird's throat. When the bird returns to the fisherman's raft, the fisherman helps the bird to remove the fish from its throat. The method is not as common today, since more efficient methods of catching fish have been developed, but is still practised as a cultural tradition.

In folklore, literature, and art

Cormorants feature in heraldry and medieval ornamentation, usually in their "wing-drying" pose, which was seen as representing the Christian cross, and symbolizing nobility and sacrifice. For John Milton in Paradise Lost, the cormorant symbolizes greed: perched atop the Tree of Life, Satan took the form of a cormorant as he spied on Adam and Eve during his first intrusion into Eden.

In some Scandinavian areas, they are considered good omen; in particular, in Norwegian tradition spirits of those lost at sea come to visit their loved ones disguised as cormorants. For example, the Norwegian municipalities of Røst, Loppa and Skjervøy have cormorants in their coat of arms. The symbolic liver bird of Liverpool is commonly thought to be a cross between an eagle and a cormorant.

In Homer's epic poem The Odyssey, Odysseus (Ulysses) is saved by a compassionate sea nymph who takes the form of a cormorant.

In 1853, a woman wearing a dress made of cormorant feathers was found on San Nicolas Island, off the southern coast of California. She had sewn the feather dress together using whale sinews. She is known as the Lone Woman of San Nicolas and was later baptised "Juana Maria" (her original name is lost). The woman had lived alone on the island for 18 years before being rescued. When removed from San Nicolas, she brought with her a green cormorant dress she made; this dress is reported to have been removed to the Vatican.

The bird has inspired numerous writers, including Amy Clampitt, who wrote a poem called "The Cormorant in its Element". The species she described may have been the pelagic cormorant, which is the only species in the temperate U.S. with the "slim head ... vermilion-strapped" and "big black feet" that she mentions.

A cormorant representing Blanche Ingram appears in the first of the fictional paintings by Jane in Charlotte Brontë's novel Jane Eyre.

In the Sherlock Holmes story "The Adventure of the Veiled Lodger", Dr. Watson warns that if there are further attempts to get at and destroy his private notes regarding his time with Holmes, "the whole story concerning the politician, the lighthouse, and the trained cormorant will be given to the public. There is at least one reader who will understand."

A cormorant is humorously mentioned as having had linseed oil rubbed into it by a wayward pupil during the "Growth and Learning" segment of the 1983 Monty Python movie Monty Python's The Meaning of Life.

The cormorant served as the hood ornament for the Packard automobile brand.

Cormorants (and books about them written by a fictional ornithologist) are a recurring fascination of the protagonist in Jesse Ball's 2018 novel Census.

The Pokémon Cramorant, featured in the 8th generation of the video game series may take its name and design from a cormorant.

The cormorant was chosen as the emblem for the Ministry of Defence Joint Services Command and Staff College at Shrivenham. A bird famed for flight, sea fishing and land nesting was felt to be particularly appropriate for a college that unified leadership training and development for the Army, Navy and Royal Air Force.

After a member produced a mock magazine cover from a photograph of roosting Cormorants, the bird became the unofficial mascot of the Pentax Discuss Mailing List with many posts dedicated to discussion of the photography of the species.
https://www.mail-archive.com/search?q=cormorant&l=pdml%40pdml.net

See also
 Anhinga
 Cormorant culling

References

Sources

 Benson, Elizabeth (1972): The Mochica: A Culture of Peru. Praeger Press, New York.
 Berrin, Katherine & Larco Museum (1997) The Spirit of Ancient Peru: Treasures from the Museo Arqueológico Rafael Larco Herrera. Thames and Hudson, New York.
 
 Dorst, J. & Mougin, J.L. (1979): Family Phalacrocoracidae. In: Mayr, Ernst & Cottrell, G.W. (eds.): Check-List of the Birds of the World Vol. 1, 2nd ed. (Struthioniformes, Tinamiformes, Procellariiformes, Sphenisciformes, Gaviiformes, Podicipediformes, Pelecaniformes, Ciconiiformes, Phoenicopteriformes, Falconiformes, Anseriformes): 163–179. Museum of Comparative Zoology, Cambridge.
 Hope, Sylvia (2002): The Mesozoic radiation of Neornithes. In: Chiappe, Luis M. & Witmer, Lawrence M. (eds.): Mesozoic Birds: Above the Heads of Dinosaurs: 339–388. 
 
 IUCN (2007): 2007 IUCN Red List of Threatened Species. IUCN, Gland.
 
 
 
 
 Orta, Jaume (1992): Family Phalacrocoracidae. In: del Hoyo, Josep; Elliott, Andrew & Sargatal, Jordi (eds.): Handbook of Birds of the World, Volume 1 (Ostrich to Ducks): 326–353, plates 22–23. Lynx Edicions, Barcelona. 
 Robertson, Connie (1998): Book of Humorous Quotations. Wordsworth Editions. 
 
 Thevet, F. André (1558): About birds of Ascension Island. In: Les singularitez de la France Antarctique, autrement nommee Amerique, & de plusieurs terres & isles decouvertes de nostre temps: 39–40. Maurice de la Porte heirs, Paris.
 van Tets, G. F. (1976): Australasia and the origin of shags and cormorants, Phalacrocoracidae. Proceedings of the XVI International Ornithological Congress: 121–124.

External links

 Cormorant videos on the Internet Bird Collection
 
 First video of cormorant deep sea dive, by the Wildlife Conservation Society and the National Research Council of Argentina. WCS press release, 2012-07-31

 
Phalacrocoracidae
Seabirds
Taxa named by Ludwig Reichenbach
Taxa described in 1850
Extant Oligocene first appearances